Sultan Abdu'l-Aziz Khan may refer to:
 Abdu'l-Aziz (1614–1683), ruler of the Khanate of Bukhara
 Abdulaziz (1830–1876), Ottoman sultan